Chorotega may refer to:

 Chorotega language, an extinct Oto-Manguean language indigenous to Honduras, El Salvador, Costa Rica and Nicaragua
 Chorotega (wasp), an insect genus in the subfamily Encyrtinae